Hamoon Bazha is a documentary film by Mani Haghighi. It is about a famous Iranian cult film named Hamoon directed by Dariush Mehrjui.

Iranian documentary films
Documentary films about films
Persian-language films
Films directed by Mani Haghighi